Chimboata Canton is one of the cantons of the Pocona Municipality, the third municipal section of the Carrasco Province in the Cochabamba Department in central Bolivia. Its seat is Chimboata (69 inhabitants, census 2001).

See also 
 Carrasco National Park
 Inkallaqta

References 
 www.ine.gov.bo

External links
 Map of Carrasco Province

Cantons of Cochabamba Department
Cantons of Bolivia